The Blues Hall of Fame is a music museum located at 421 S. Main Street in Memphis, Tennessee. Initially, the "Blues Hall of Fame" was not a physical building, but a listing of people who have significantly contributed to blues music. Started in 1980 by the Blues Foundation, it honors people who have performed, recorded, or documented blues. The actual building for the hall opened to the public on May 8, 2015.

Inductees

Performers

Non Performers

Literature

Albums

Singles/album tracks

References

External links
Blues Foundation official website

Blues music awards
Music halls of fame
Halls of fame in Tennessee
Awards established in 1980
Music museums in Tennessee
Museums in Memphis, Tennessee